Hapoel Ramat Gan is a handball team from the city of Ramat Gan, Israel.

Hapoel was one of the biggest handball club in Israel until the mid-1980s, they won 2 championships and 8 Israeli cups.

They now compete in Liga Leumit which is the second division in Israeli handball competition.

Titles 
Israel Champions (2): 1969, 1971
Israel Cup Holder (8): 1966, 1968, 1969, 1970, 1971, 1972, 1975, 1976

References

Israeli handball clubs